Neurosteroids, also known as neuroactive steroids, are endogenous or exogenous steroids that rapidly alter neuronal excitability through interaction with ligand-gated ion channels and other cell surface receptors. The term neurosteroid was coined by the French physiologist Étienne-Émile Baulieu and refers to steroids synthesized in the brain. The term, neuroactive steroid refers to steroids that can be synthesized in the brain, or are synthesized by an endocrine gland, that then reach the brain through the bloodstream and have effects on brain function. The term neuroactive steroids was first coined in 1992 by Steven Paul and Robert Purdy. In addition to their actions on neuronal membrane receptors, some of these steroids may also exert effects on gene expression via nuclear steroid hormone receptors. Neurosteroids have a wide range of potential clinical applications from sedation to treatment of epilepsy and traumatic brain injury. Ganaxolone, a synthetic analog of the endogenous neurosteroid allopregnanolone, is under investigation for the treatment of epilepsy.

Classification

Based on differences in activity and structure, neurosteroids can be broadly categorized into several different major groupings.

Inhibitory neurosteroids
These neurosteroids exert inhibitory actions on neurotransmission. They act as positive allosteric modulators of the GABAA receptor (especially δ subunit-containing isoforms), and possess, in no particular order, antidepressant, anxiolytic, stress-reducing, rewarding, prosocial, antiaggressive, prosexual, sedative, pro-sleep, cognitive and memory-impairing, analgesic, anesthetic, anticonvulsant, neuroprotective, and neurogenic effects.

Major examples include tetrahydrodeoxycorticosterone (THDOC), the androstane 3α-androstanediol, the cholestane cholesterol and the pregnanes pregnanolone (eltanolone), allopregnanolone (3α,5α-THP).

Excitatory neurosteroids
These neurosteroids have excitatory effects on neurotransmission. They act as potent negative allosteric modulators of the GABAA receptor, weak positive allosteric modulators of the NMDA receptor, and/or agonists of the σ1 receptor, and mostly have antidepressant, anxiogenic, cognitive and memory-enhancing, convulsant, neuroprotective, and neurogenic effects.

Major examples include the pregnanes pregnenolone sulfate (PS), epipregnanolone, and isopregnanolone (sepranolone), the androstanes dehydroepiandrosterone (DHEA; prasterone), and dehydroepiandrosterone sulfate (DHEA-S; prasterone sulfate), and the cholestane 24(S)-hydroxycholesterol (NMDA receptor-selective; very potent).

Pheromones
Pheromones are neurosteroids that influence brain activity, notably hypothalamic function, via activation of vomeronasal receptor cells.

They include the androstanes androstadienol, androstadienone, androstenol, and androstenone and the estrane estratetraenol.

Other neurosteroids
Certain other endogenous steroids, such as pregnenolone, progesterone, estradiol, and corticosterone are also neurosteroids. However, unlike those listed above, these neurosteroids do not modulate the GABAA or NMDA receptors, and instead affect various other cell surface receptors and non-genomic targets. Also, many endogenous steroids, including pregnenolone, progesterone, corticosterone, deoxycorticosterone, DHEA, and testosterone, are metabolized into (other) neurosteroids, effectively functioning as so-called proneurosteroids.

Biosynthesis
Neurosteroids are synthesized from cholesterol, which is converted into pregnenolone and then into all other endogenous steroids. Neurosteroids are produced in the brain after local synthesis or by conversion of peripherally-derived adrenal steroids or gonadal steroids. They accumulate especially in myelinating glial cells, from cholesterol or steroidal precursors imported from peripheral sources. 5α-reductase type I and 3α-hydroxysteroid dehydrogenase are involved in the biosynthesis of inhibitory neurosteroids, while 3β-hydroxysteroid dehydrogenase and hydroxysteroid sulfotransferases are involved in excitatory neurosteroid production.

Function
Some major known biological functions of neurosteroids include modulation of neural plasticity, learning and memory processes, behavior, and seizure susceptibility, as well as responses to stress, anxiety, and depression. Neurosteroids also appear to play an important role in various sexually-dimorphic behaviors and emotional responses.

Acute stress elevates the levels of inhibitory neurosteroids like allopregnanolone, and these neurosteroids are known to counteract many of the effects of stress. This is similar to the case of endorphins, which are released in response to stress and physical pain and counteract the negative subjective effects of such states. As such, it has been suggested that one of the biological functions of these neuromodulators may be to help maintain emotional homeostasis. Chronic stress has been associated with diminished levels of allopregnanolone and altered allopregnanolone stress responsivity, psychiatric disorders, and hypothalamic-pituitary-adrenal axis dysregulation.

It is thought that fluctuations in the levels of inhibitory neurosteroids during the menstrual cycle and pregnancy play an important role in a variety of women's conditions, including premenstrual syndrome (PMS), premenstrual dysphoric disorder (PMDD), postpartum depression (PPD), postpartum psychosis, and catamenial epilepsy. In addition, it is thought that changes in neurosteroid levels may be involved in the changes in mood, anxiety, and sexual desire that occur during puberty in both sexes and during menopause in women.

Elevated levels of inhibitory neurosteroids, namely allopregnanolone, can produce paradoxical effects, such as negative mood, anxiety, irritability, and aggression. This appears to be because these neurosteroids, like other positive allosteric modulators of the GABAA receptor such as the benzodiazepines, barbiturates, and ethanol, possess biphasic, U-shaped actions – moderate levels (in the range of 1.5–2 nM/L total alloprogesterone, which are approximately equivalent to luteal phase levels) inhibit the activity of the GABAA receptor, while lower and higher concentrations facilitate the activity of the receptor.

Biological activity

Sigma-1 receptor

Therapeutic applications

Anesthesia
Several synthetic neurosteroids have been used as sedatives for the purpose of general anaesthesia for carrying out surgical procedures. The best known of these are alphaxolone, alphadolone, hydroxydione, and minaxolone. The first of these to be introduced was hydroxydione, which is the esterified 21-hydroxy derivative of 5β-pregnanedione. Hydroxydione proved to be a useful anaesthetic drug with a good safety profile, but was painful and irritating when injected probably due to poor water solubility. This led to the development of newer neuroactive steroids. The next drug from this family to be marketed was a mixture of alphaxolone and alphadolone, known as Althesin. This was withdrawn from human use due to rare but serious toxic reactions, but is still used in veterinary medicine. The next neurosteroid anaesthetic introduced into human medicine was the newer drug minaxolone, which is around three times more potent than althesin and retains the favourable safety profile, without the toxicity problems seen with althesin. However this drug was also ultimately withdrawn, not because of problems in clinical use, but because animal studies suggested potential carcinogenicity and since alternative agents were available it was felt that the possible risk outweighed the benefit of keeping the drug on the market.

Ganaxolone

The neurosteroid ganaxolone, an analog of the progesterone metabolite allopregnanolone, has been extensively investigated in animal models and is currently in clinical trials for the treatment of epilepsy. Neurosteroids, including ganaxolone have a broad spectrum of activity in animal models. They may have advantages over other GABAA receptor modulators, notably benzodiazepines, in that tolerance does not appear to occur with extended use.

A randomized, placebo controlled, 10-week phase 2 clinical trial of orally administered ganaxolone in adults with partial onset seizure demonstrated that the treatment is safe, well tolerated and efficacious. The drug continued to demonstrate efficacy in a 104-week open label extension. Data from non-clinical studies suggest that ganaxolone may have low risk for use in pregnancy. In addition to use in the treatment of epilepsy, the drug has potential in the treatment of a broad range of neurological and psychiatric conditions. Proof-of-concept studies are currently underway in posttraumatic stress disorder and fragile X syndrome. Ganaxolone was approved for medical use in the United States in March 2022.

Catamenial epilepsy
Researchers have suggested the use of so-called "neurosteroid replacement therapy" as a way of treating catamenial epilepsy with neuroactive steroids such as ganaxolone during the period of the menstrual cycle when seizure frequency increases. Micronized progesterone, which behaves reliably as a prodrug to allopregnanolone, has been suggested as a treatment for catamenial epilepsy in the same manner.

Allopregnanolone
Allopregnanolone (SAGE-547) is under development as an intravenous therapy for the treatment of super-refractory status epilepticus, postpartum depression, and essential tremor.

Other applications
4,16-Androstadien-3β-ol (PH94B, Aloradine) is a synthetic pheromone, or pherine, neurosteroid which is under investigation for the treatment of anxiety disorders in women.

3β-Methoxypregnenolone (MAP-4343), or pregnenolone 3β-methyl ether, is a synthetic neuroactive steroid and pregnenolone derivative that interacts with microtubule-associated protein 2 (MAP2) in a similar manner to pregnenolone and is under development for potential clinical use for indications such as the treatment of brain and spinal cord injury and depressive disorders.

Role in antidepressant action
Certain antidepressant drugs such as fluoxetine and fluvoxamine, which are generally thought to affect depression by acting as selective serotonin reuptake inhibitors (SSRIs), have also been found to normalize the levels of certain neurosteroids (which are frequently deficient in depressed patients) at doses that are inactive in affecting the reuptake of serotonin. This suggests that other actions involving neurosteroids may also be at play in the effectiveness of these drugs against depression.

Benzodiazepine effects on neurosteroids
Benzodiazepines may influence neurosteroid metabolism by virtue of their actions on translocator protein (TSPO; "peripheral benzodiazepine receptor"). The pharmacological actions of benzodiazepines at the GABAA receptor are similar to those of neurosteroids. Factors which affect the ability of individual benzodiazepines to alter neurosteroid levels may depend upon whether the individual benzodiazepine drug interacts with TSPO. Some benzodiazepines may also inhibit neurosteroidogenic enzymes reducing neurosteroid synthesis.

See also
 List of neurosteroids
 Neurosteroidogenesis inhibitor
 Membrane steroid receptor

References

Further reading

 
 
 
 
 
 

 
Neurophysiology